Murfin is a surname. Notable people with the surname include:

Jane Murfin (1884–1955),  American playwright and screenwriter
Orin G. Murfin (1876–1956), United States Navy admiral

See also
Murdin
Murfin Music International, British radio broadcasting company